Donald Osmund Oslear (3 March 1929 – 10 May 2018) was a Test cricket umpire from England.

Don Oslear was born in Cleethorpes, Lincolnshire, England, in 1929 and joined the first-class panel in 1975 at the age of 46 without any first-class playing experience.  He stood in five Test matches between 1980 and 1984 and eight One Day Internationals, including a semi-final of the 1983 World Cup. He umpired 360 first-class matches between 1975 and 1993.

See also
 List of Test cricket umpires
 List of One Day International cricket umpires

References

1929 births
2018 deaths
People from Cleethorpes
English Test cricket umpires
English One Day International cricket umpires